The Young Kikuyu Association (YKA) was formed in Kenya on 10 June 1921, as a break away organisation from the Kikuyu Association (KA). In July 1921 it was renamed the East Africa Association (EAA).
Harry Thuku, who had previously been secretary of the KA, felt that the KA was not demanding enough from the British Authorities in Kenya and that grievances should be sent directly to London.

Young Kikuyu Association was formed to protest against; land alienation by the colonial government                                                                 The kipande system                                                                                                                                                                       taxation on Africans                                                                                                                                                              Poor wages and poor working conditions                                                                                                                                                   Harry Thuku held public meetings where he addressed the evils of colonial rule. he advocated on total liberation of african land from the colonial government                                                                                                                                              Thuku through YKA sent a document containing the grievances to the Native commissioner O.H. Watkins but never sorted them out.                                                                     Harry Thuku felt that YKA was not effective as such and he formed EAA on July 1921 to give it a national outlook                                                         Harry Thuku's idea was to recruit a bigger representation and a more sound organization that would fight for change even outside kenya's boundaries

References

History of Kenya
Political parties established in 1921
British Kenya
Defunct political parties in Kenya
1920 establishments in Kenya
Political parties with year of disestablishment missing